Akuila Mafi (date of birth unknown) is a Tasmanian-raised Tongan former rugby union fly-half.

Career
Mafi started his international career playing in the 1995 Rugby World Cup Tonga squad, coached by Fakahau Valu. He played against Ivory Coast, in Rustenburg, on 3 June, where he replaced the first choice fly-half Elisi Vunipola during the match. This match was also his last cap for Tonga.

References

External links

Date of birth missing (living people)
Tongan rugby union players
Rugby union fly-halves
Tonga international rugby union players
Tongan expatriates in Australia
Living people
Year of birth missing (living people)